This is a list of all the United States Supreme Court cases from volume 340 of the United States Reports:

External links

1950 in United States case law
1951 in United States case law